The Brokers Exchange in Tonopah, Nevada, also known as the Tonopah Divide Mining Company was built in 1905 during Tonopah's mining boom.  Originally a two-story building, it housed a brokerage, real estate office, and the offices of  Tonopah lawyer (later United States Senator) Patrick McCarran. A fire destroyed the upper floor in 1912. The Tonopah Divide Mining Company, controlled by George Wingfield and Cal Brougher, purchased the property for use as an office in 1919.  The ruined top story was removed and the first floor was re-roofed and capped with a decorate plaster frieze.

The building occupies a corner lot, with four storefront bays facing Brougher Avenue and a diagonal entrance at the corner of St. Patrick Street.

References

Tonopah, Nevada
Buildings and structures in Nye County, Nevada
Commercial buildings completed in 1905
Commercial buildings on the National Register of Historic Places in Nevada
National Register of Historic Places in Tonopah, Nevada
1905 establishments in Nevada
Gothic Revival architecture in Nevada